Yasmine Leïla Bekhti (born 6 March 1984) is a French film and television actress. She is best known for her roles in Tout ce qui brille (2007) and, in 2006, Paris, je t'aime and Sheitan.

Early life
Bekhti was born in 1984 in Issy-les-Moulineaux to an Algerian family from Sidi Bel-Abbes. She is the youngest of three children. 

She next studied in the programme of Bérengère Basty at the Art’aire studio. To live and pay for her acting studies, she worked odd jobs (clothes, telemarketing).

She has self-identified as a Muslim and speaks Algerian Arabic as well, because of her grandmother.

Career

In 2005, Bekhti's friends convinced her to go to the casting of Sheitan, where she was selected for the role of Yasmin, a young beurette. Released on 1 February 2006, Sheitan spent 13 weeks in cinemas, selling around 300,000 tickets.

That same year, she acted opposite Smaïn in Alain Tasma's telefilm Harkis. The film told the story of an Algerian family who suffers persecution by French military forces, despite having fought on their side in the Algerian War. Bekhti was interested in the film's subject as several members of her family, including her grandfather, fought in the ranks of the FLN during the war.

That year, she also played Zarka in Paris, je t'aime (2006) (segment "Quais de Seine", directed by Gurinder Chadha) and Mounia in Mauvaise Foi, playing the sister of Roschdy Zem. On television, she had a small role in an episode of the series Madame le Proviseur and in the series Les Tricheurs alongside Pascal Légitimus.

In 2008 she won a Best Actress Award at the Silhouette Festival for her role in Rachid Hami's Choisir d'aimer. She followed this with Pour l'amour de Dieu, an Arte telefilm by Ahmed Bouchaala and Zakia Tahri. Bekhti starred in Ali Baba alongside Gérard Jugnot and appeared in Des poupées et des anges by Nora Hamdi. For her role as Lya in the film, she was shortlisted for the César Award for Best Actress, although she did not make the final list of nominees.

That same year, two supporting roles helped increase her visibility: one in Mesrine: Killer Instinct by Jean-Francois Richet, and especially that of Djamila in A Prophet directed by Jacques Audiard. She played the only female role in the latter film, which won nine César Awards and the Grand Prix at Cannes.

Meanwhile, Bekhti returned to television with Conte de la frustration, starring Nicolas Cazalé and Roschdy Zem and a new episode of Tricheurs. She also participated in the web-series Twenty Show, the result of a unique partnership between Arte and MySpace, which was released as a documentary film a year later.

In 2009, besides a third appearance in Tricheurs, she played the role of Myriam in the two-part mini-series Le choix de Myriam, which portrayed the saga of an Algerian family's arrival in France.

After seeing Bekhti's performance in Mauvaise foi, actress Géraldine Nakache offered Bekhti a role in Tout ce qui brille, Nakache's debut film as a director. Released on 24 March 2010, Tout ce qui brille was a critical and commercial success with over 1.3 million tickets sold. Bekhti went on to win a Golden Swan Award at the Cabourg Film Festival and the César Award for Most Promising Actress for her role as Lila.

In 2010 she worked in a wide variety of projects. She worked with Alain Tasma again in the telefilm Vous êtes leur crainte, based on the novel of the same name by Thierry Jonquet. She also appeared in Jean-Luc Perréard's Itinéraire bis, in the musical Toi, moi, les autres... directed by Audrey Estrougo and in Anne De Petrini's debut film Il reste du jambon?.

Her latest film, the French-Moroccan co-production The Source, competed at the 2011 Cannes Film Festival.

In 2011 she was signed as the new face of L'Oréal, the cosmetic firm.

In 2016 she played the French police officer Kahina Zadi in the Swedish television series Midnattssol opposite Peter Stormare.

Personal life 
Bekhti is married to fellow French-Algerian actor Tahar Rahim, whom she met while filming A Prophet in 2007. They have three children together, a son born in 2017 then a daughter in 2020, with an unexpected third child in 2021.

Filmography

Discography

Singles

Awards and nominations

See also

 Maghrebian community of Paris

References

External links

 Interview, Écran Large

1984 births
Living people
French film actresses
21st-century French actresses
Actresses from Paris
Actresses of Algerian descent
French people of Algerian descent
French Muslims
French television actresses
Most Promising Actress César Award winners